Kenneth Todd Young (1916 – August 29, 1972) was a former United States Ambassador to Thailand (1961-1963) and former president of the Asia Society.  A resident of Larchmont, New York, Young died of a heart attack in Washington, DC at the age of 56.

Young was actively involved with Harvard University. Young graduated with an A.B. in 1939 and A.M. in 1942.  He was a trustee of the Harvard-Yenching Institute and member of the Visiting Committee, Harvard Department of Far Eastern Languages. The Kenneth T. Young Professorship of Sino-Vietnamese History was established in 1973 in his honor.

Biography

Young attended Lingnan University in China from 1934 until 1935 after graduating from the Middlesex School and starting at Harvard College. His ancestors were from “an old Maine family” but Young was born in Canada.  In 1943, he married Patricia Morris, a Vassar alumna, daughter of George Maurice Morris, a president of the American Bar Association.  Young was a teaching fellow at Harvard and served in the Air Force before joining the State Department in 1946 as a political intelligence officer in 1946.  He was a director of the Office of Southeast Asian Affairs from 1956 to 1958.  For three years, Young worked for the Standard Vacuum Oil Company before President John F. Kennedy named him Ambassador to Bangkok.

References

External links
 YOUNG, KENNETH T.: ORAL HISTORY INTERVIEW - JFK #1, 2/25/1969

1916 births
1972 deaths
Ambassadors of the United States to Thailand
Harvard College alumni
People from Larchmont, New York
United States Army Air Forces personnel of World War II
Middlesex School alumni